Glenea problematica is a species of beetle in the family Cerambycidae. It was described by Lin and Yang in 2009. It is known from Myanmar, China, Thailand, and Laos.

References

problematica
Beetles described in 2009